Books and some articles relating to coal mining, especially historical.

Current conditions
 Burns, Daniel. The modern practice of coal mining (1907)
 Chirons, Nicholas P. Coal Age Handbook of Coal Surface Mining (1978) 
 Hamilton, Michael S. Mining Environmental Policy: Comparing Indonesia and the USA (Burlington, VT: Ashgate, 2005)..
 Hayes, Geoffrey. Coal Mining (2004), 32 pp
 
 Charles V. Nielsen and George F. Richardson. 1982 Keystone Coal Industry Manual (1982)
 Saleem H. Ali. "Minding our Minerals, 2006."
 Speight, James G, "An Introduction to Petroleum Technology, Economics, and Politics," John Wiley & Sons 2011.
 
 World Coal Institute.  The Coal Resource (2005) covers all aspects of the coal industry in 48 pp.
 Woytinsky, W. S., and E. S. Woytinsky. World Population and Production Trends and Outlooks (1953) pp 840–881; with many tables and maps on the worldwide coal industry in 1950

Fiction and Poetry

 Brierley, Walter. Means Test Man (1935).
 Chaplin, Sid.The Thin Seam (1949). 
 Cookson, Catherine.Tilly Trotter (1980), and other books by this author.
 Cronin, A. J. The Stars Look Down (1935), The Citadel (1937). 
 Davies, Idris. Gwalia Deserta (1938) and The Angry Summer: A Poem of 1926 (1943).
 Giardina, Denise. Storming Heaven (1988), The Unquiet Earth (1992).
 Grisham, John. Gray Mountain (2014)
 Harrison, Tony. "v." (1985). 
 Hensher, Philip.The Northern Clemency (2008). 
 Heslop, Harold. Last Cage Down (1935). 
 Jones, Jack. Black Parade (1935). 
 Jones, Lewis. Cwmardy (1937) and We Live (1939).
 Kirk, Sam. The Coal Boat (2018).
 Lawrence, D. H. Sons and Lovers (1913). 
 Lillo, Baldomero. Sub terra (1904).
 Llewellyn, Richard. How Green Was My Valley (1939). 
 Rosenberg, Madelyn. Canary in the Coal Mine (2013).
 Peace, David. GB84 (2004).
 Sinclair, Upton. King Coal (1917), The Coal War (1976). 
 Verne, Jules. The Child of the Cavern (1877).
 Welsh, James C. Songs of A Miner (1917), The Underworld (1920), and The Morlocks (1924). 
 Wiseman, Ellen Marie. "The Coal River" (2015).
 Zola, Emile. Germinal (1885).

Coal mining history
 Freese, Barbara, Coal: A Human History (2004). .
 Jeffrey, E. C. Coal and Civilization. 1925.

Britain

Bibliographic guides
 Benson, J., Thompson, C.H. & Neville, R.G. Bibliography of the British coal industry. 1981
 British Library, Coal mining (Social Sciences Collection Guides: Topical Bibliographies)
 Galloway, R.L. Annals of coal mining and the coal trade. - v1 of the 1971 reprint has a bibliography in the introduction.
 Linsley, S.M. The Coal Industry - A Select Bibliography. Durham Mining Museum
 Mining History Network Bibliography of British Mining History: Published Since 1987. Despite the title there is earlier material included.
 North of England Institute of Mining and Mechanical Engineers. Nicholas Wood Memorial Library. History of mining in the UK: some useful books. 2018

Histories and manuals
 Ashton, T. S. & Sykes, J. The coal industry of the eighteenth century. 1929.
 Baylies, Carolyn.  The History of the Yorkshire Miners, 1881–1918 Routledge (1993).
 Benson, John.  "Coalmining" in Chris Wrigley, ed. A History of British industrial relations, 1875–1914 (Univ of Massachusetts Press, 1982), pp 187–208.
 Benson, John. British Coal-Miners in the Nineteenth Century: A Social History Holmes & Meier, (1980).
 Buxton, N.K. The economic development of the British coal industry: from Industrial Revolution to the present day. 1979.
 Coombes, B. L. These Poor Hands: The Autobiography of a Miner Working in South Wales (1939).
 Dron, Robert W.  The economics of coal mining (1928).
 Fine, B. The Coal Question: Political Economy and Industrial Change from the Nineteenth Century to the Present Day (1990).
 Galloway, R.L. Annals of coal mining and the coal trade. First series [to 1835] 1898; Second series. [1835–80] 1904. Reprinted 1971
 Galloway, Robert L. A History Of Coal Mining In Great Britain (1882) Online at Open Library
 Griffin, A. R. The British coalmining industry: retrospect and prospect. 1977.
 Hanley, James. Grey Children: A Study in Humbug and Misery. 1937.
 Hatcher, John, et al. The History of the British Coal Industry (5 vol, Oxford U.P., 1984–87); 3000 pages of scholarly history
 John Hatcher:  The History of the British Coal Industry: Volume 1: Before 1700: Towards the Age of Coal (1993).
 Michael W. Flinn, and David Stoker. History of the British Coal Industry: Volume 2. 1700–1830: The Industrial Revolution (1984).
  Roy Church, Alan Hall and John Kanefsky. History of the British Coal Industry: Volume 3: Victorian Pre-Eminence
 Barry Supple.
  William Ashworth and Mark Pegg. History of the British Coal Industry: Volume 5: 1946–1982: The Nationalized Industry (1986)
 Heinemann, Margot. Britain's coal: A study of the mining crisis (1944).
 
 
 Hughes. Herbert W, A Text-Book of Mining: For the use of colliery managers and others (London, many editions 1892–1917), the standard British textbook for its era.
 Hull, Edward. Our coal resources at the close of the nineteenth century (1897) Online at Open Library. Stress on geology.
 Jaffe, James Alan. The Struggle for Market Power: Industrial Relations in the British Coal Industry, 1800–1840 (2003).
 Jevons, H.S. The British coal trade. 1920, reprinted 1969
 Jevons, W. Stanley. The Coal Question: An Inquiry Concerning the Progress of the Nation, and the Probable Exhaustion of Our Coal Mines (1865).
 Kirby, M.W. The British coalmining industry, 1870–1946: a political and economic history. 1977.
 Lucas, Arthur F. "A British Experiment in the Control of Competition: The Coal Mines Act of 1930." Quarterly Journal of Economics (1934): 418–441.  in JSTOR
 Prest, Wilfred. "The British Coal Mines Act of 1930, Another Interpretation." Quarterly Journal of Economics (1936): 313–332. in JSTOR
 Lewis, B. Coal mining in the eighteenth and nineteenth centuries. (Longman, 1971).
 McIvor, Arthur and Ronald Johnston. Miners’ Lung: A History of Dust Disease in British Coal Mining 2007) 
 Nef, J. U. Rise of the British coal industry. 2v 1932, a comprehensive scholarly survey
 Orwell, George. "Down the Mine" (The Road to Wigan Pier chapter 2, 1937) full text
 Rowe, J.W.F. Wages In the coal industry (1923).
 Tonge, James. The principles and practice of coal mining (1906)
 Waller, Robert.  The Dukeries Transformed: A history of the development of the Dukeries coal field after 1920 (Oxford U.P., 1983) on the Dukeries
 Williams, Chris. Capitalism, community and conflict: The south Wales coalfield, 1898–1947 (U of Wales Press, 1998).

United States
 Burning the Future: Coal in America (film)
 Mountain Top Removal (film)
 Loeb, Penny. Moving Mountains: How One Woman and Her Community Won Justice from Big Coal (University of Kentucky Press, 2007).

Industry
 Adams, Sean Patrick, . "The US Coal Industry in the Nineteenth Century." EH.Net Encyclopedia, August 15, 2001 scholarly overview
 Adams, Sean Patrick. "Promotion, Competition, Captivity: The Political Economy of Coal," Journal of Policy History (2006) 18#1 pp 74–95 online
 Adams, Sean Patrick. Old Dominion, Industrial Commonwealth: Coal, Politics, and Economy in Antebellum America. Johns Hopkins University Press, 2004.
 Binder, Frederick Moore.  Coal Age Empire: Pennsylvania Coal and Its Utilization to 1860. Harrisburg: Pennsylvania Historical and Museum Commission, 1974.
 Chandler, Alfred. "Anthracite Coal and the Beginnings of the 'Industrial Revolution' in the United States", Business History Review 46 (1972): 141–181. in JSTOR
 Davies, Edward J., II. The Anthracite Aristocracy: Leadership and Social Change in the Hard Coal Regions of Northeastern Pennsylvania, 1800–1930 (1985).
 DiCiccio, Carmen. Coal and Coke in Pennsylvania. Harrisburg: Pennsylvania Historical and Museum Commission, 1996
 Conley, Phil. History of West Virginia Coal Industry (Charleston: Education Foundation, 1960)
 Eavenson, Howard. The First Century and a Quarter of the American Coal Industry 1942.
 Verla R. Flores and A. Dudley Gardner. Forgotten Frontier: A History of Wyoming Coal Mining (1989)
 Goodell, Jeff. Big Coal: The Dirty Secret Behind America's Energy Future (2006) 
 Hudson Coal Company. The Story of Anthracite (New York, 1932), 425pp; Useful overview of the industry in the 20th century; fair-minded with an operators perspective
 Lauver, Fred J. "A Walk Through the Rise and Fall of Anthracite Might", Pennsylvania Heritage Magazine 27#1 (2001) online edition
 Long, Priscilla. Where the Sun Never Shines: A History of America's Bloody Coal Industry. Paragon, 1989.
 Nelson, Robert H. The Making of Federal Coal Policy (1983)
 Netschert, Bruce C.  and Sam H. Schurr, Energy in the American Economy, 1850–1975: An Economic Study of Its History and Prospects. (1960)
  Parker, Glen Lawhon. The Coal Industry: A Study in Social Control (Washington: American Council on Public Affairs, 1940)
 Powell, H. Benjamin. Philadelphia's First Fuel Crisis. Jacob Cist and the Developing Market for Pennsylvania Anthracite. The Pennsylvania State University Press, 1978.
 Rottenberg, Dan. In the Kingdom of Coal: An American Family and the Rock That Changed the World (2003), owners' perspective
 Shnayerson, Michael. Coal River: How a Few Brave Americans Took on a Powerful Company–and the Federal Government–to Save the Land They Love (2008)
 Schurr, Sam H., and Bruce C. Netschert. Energy in the American Economy, 1850–1975: An Economic Study of Its History and Prospects. Johns Hopkins Press, 1960.
 Veenstra, Theodore A., and Wilbert G. Fritz. "Major Economic Tendencies in the Bituminous Coal Industry," Quarterly Journal of Economics 51#1 (1936) pp. 106–130 in JSTOR
 Vietor, Richard H. K. and Martin V. Melosi; Environmental Politics and the Coal Coalition Texas A&M University Press, 1980
 Warren, Kenneth. Triumphant Capitalism: Henry Clay Frick and the Industrial Transformation of America. Pittsburgh: University of Pittsburgh Press, 1996.

Primary sources
 United States Anthracite Coal Strike Commission, 1902–1903, Report to the President on the Anthracite Coal Strike of May–October, 1902 By United States Anthracite Coal Strike (1903) online edition
 Report of the United states coal commission.... (5 vol in 3; 1925) Official US government investigation of the 1922 anthracite strike. online vol 1–2
 Tryon, Frederick Gale, and Joseph Henry Willits, eds. What the Coal Commission Found: An Authoritative Summary by the Staff (1925).
 General policies committee of anthracite operators. The anthracite coal strike of 1922: A statement of its causes and underlying purposes (1923); Official statement by the operators. online

Coal miners and unions
 Arnold, Andrew B. Fueling the Gilded Age: Railroads, Miners, and Disorder in Pennsylvania Coal Country (2014)
 Aurand, Harold W.  Coalcracker Culture: Work and Values in Pennsylvania Anthracite, 1835–1935  (2003).
 Baratz, Morton S.  The Union and the Coal Industry (Yale University Press, 1955)
 Blatz, Perry. Democratic Miners: Work and Labor Relations in the Anthracite Coal Industry, 1875–1925. Albany: SUNY Press, 1994.
 Coal Mines Administration, U.S, Department Of The Interior. A Medical Survey of the Bituminous-Coal Industry. U.S. Government Printing Office. 1947.
 Corbin, David Alan Life, Work, and Rebellion in the Coal Fields: The Southern West Virginia Miners, 1880–1922 (1981)
 Dix, Keith. What's a Coal Miner to Do? The Mechanization of Coal Mining (1988), changes in the coal industry prior to 1940
 Dubofsky, Melvyn and Warren Van Tine, John L. Lewis: A Biography (1977), leader of Mine Workers union, 1920–1960
 Eller, Ronald D. Miners, Millhands, and Mountaineers: Industrialization of the Appalachian South, 1880–1930 1982.
 Price V. Fishback. Soft Coal, Hard Choices: The Economic Welfare of Bituminous Coal Miners, 1890–1930 (1992)
 Grossman, Jonathan.  "The Coal Strike of 1902 – Turning Point in U.S. Policy" Monthly Labor Review October 1975. online
 Harvey, Katherine. The Best Dressed Miners: Life and Labor in the Maryland Coal Region, 1835–1910. Cornell University Press, 1993.
 Hinrichs; A. F. The United Mine Workers of America, and the Non-Union Coal Fields Columbia University, 1923.
 Lantz; Herman R. People of Coal Town Columbia University Press, 1958; on southern Illinois.
 Laslett, John H.M. ed. The United Mine Workers: A Model of Industrial Solidarity? Penn State University Press, 1996.
 Lewis, Ronald L.  Black Coal Miners in America: Race, Class, and Community Conflict. University Press of Kentucky, 1987.
 Lunt, Richard D. Law and Order vs. the Miners: West Virginia, 1907–1933 Archon Books, 1979, On labor conflicts of the early 20th century.
 Lynch, Edward A.  and David J. McDonald.  Coal and Unionism: A History of the American Coal Miners' Unions (1939)
 McIntosh, Robert. Boys in the pits: Child labour in coal mines (McGill-Queen's Press-MQUP, 2000), Canadian mines
 Phelan, Craig. Divided Loyalties: The Public and Private Life of Labor Leader John Mitchell (1994)
 Rössel, Jörg. "Industrial Structure, Union Strategy and Strike Activity in Bituminous Coal Mining, 1881–1894", Social Science History  (2002) 16#1 pp 1–32.
 Seltzer, Curtis. Fire in the Hole: Miners and Managers in the American Coal Industry University Press of Kentucky, 1985, conflict in the coal industry to the 1980s.
 Smith, Richard C. Human Crisis in the Kingdom of Coal Friendship Press, 1952, covers the plight of the coal worker in European and American coal centers.
 Trotter Jr., Joe William. Coal, Class, and Color: Blacks in Southern West Virginia, 1915–32 (1990)
 U.S. Immigration Commission, Report on Immigrants in Industries, Part I: Bituminous Coal Mining, 2 vols. Senate Document no. 633, 61st Cong., 2nd sess. (1911)
 Wallace, Anthony F.C. St. Clair. A Nineteenth-Century Coal Town's Experience with a Disaster-Prone Industry. Knopf, 1981.
 Ward, Robert D. and William W. Rogers, Labor Revolt in Alabama: The Great Strike of 1894 University of Alabama Press, 1965 online the coal strike

China
 Dorian, James P. Minerals, Energy, and Economic Development in China Clarendon Press, 1994
 Huaichuan Rui; Globalisation, Transition and Development in China: The Case of the Coal Industry Routledge, 2004
 Kuenzer, Claudia. Coal Mining in China (In: Schumacher-Voelker, E., and Mueller, B., (Eds.), 2007: BusinessFocus China, Energy: A Comprehensive Overview of the Chinese Energy Sector. gic Deutschland Verlag, 281 pp.,  pp. 62–68)
 Thomson; Elspeth. The Chinese Coal Industry: An Economic History Routledge 2003.
 Wu, Shellen Xiao. Empires of Coal: Fueling China’s Entry into the Modern World Order, 1860–1920 (Stanford University Press, 2015) 266 pp.  online review

Europe
 Parnell, Martin F. The German Tradition of Organized Capitalism: Self-Government in the Coal Industry Oxford University Press Inc., 1998
 Pounds, Norman J. G.,  and William N. Parker; Coal and Steel in Western Europe; the Influence of Resources and Techniques on Production Indiana University Press, 1957
 Pounds, Norman J. G. An Historical Geography of Europe, 1800–1914 (1993)
 Pounds, Norman J. G. The Ruhr: A Study in Historical and Economic Geography (1952)

Other
 Calderón, Roberto R. Mexican Coal Mining Labor in Texas & Coahuila, 1880–1930 (2000) 294pp.
 Frank, David. J. B. McLachlan: A Biography: The Story of a Legendary Labour Leader and the Cape Breton Coal Miners, (1999), in Canada
 Marsden, Susan, Coals to Newcastle: a History of Coal Loading at the Port of Newcastle, New South Wales 1797–1997 (2002) ; Australia
 Nimura Kazuo, Andrew Gordon, and Terry Boardman; The Ashio Riot of 1907: A Social History of Mining in Japan Duke University Press, 1997
 A.K. Srivastava. Coal Mining Industry in India (1998)

See also
 Coal mining

Coal mining

 
Bibliographies of industry
Lists of books